Eyes is a maze shooter arcade game created by Miami-based developer Digitrex Techstar and published in 1982 by Rock-Ola. It was licensed for the European market by Zaccaria with different cabinet art.

Gameplay

The player controls an eyeball in a maze. As in Pac-Man the goal is to collect all of the dots to advance to next level, but in Eyes the player shoots the dots rather than eating them. Computer-controlled eyes chase and shoot at the player. Shooting a computer eye gives points and removes it from the level, but it will reappear a short time later. Being shot by a computer eye is fatal.

As the game progresses, more computer eyes are added to levels and they take less time to shoot at the player. They also move faster. There are eight different mazes.

See also
 Nibbler, a Rock-Ola game with similar visual elements

References

External links

1982 video games
Arcade video games
Arcade-only video games
Maze games
Video games developed in the United States